Alexis Granowsky (1890–1937) was a Russian theatre director who later became a film director. Granowsky was born as Abraham Azarkh to a Jewish family in Moscow. After studying in St. Petersburg, he went to Munich where he gained valuable theatre experience working under Max Reinhardt. He served in the Russian army during the First World War before in 1919 he set up his own Jewish-orientated theatre in St. Petersburg, which under a new director became GOSET. Granowsky's reputation rose quickly over the following years, as he became one of the most celebrated theatre directors in Europe. In 1925 Granowsky directed his first film, a silent, but concentrated his efforts on his stage work.

After the Russian Revolution, and the Communist victory in the Russian Civil War, Granowsky continued to live in the country even though he felt himself culturally Western European. Granowsky was initially feted by the Soviet authorities and was awarded a number of honours but he began to find their cultural policies increasingly restrictive, and emigrated to the Weimar Republic in the late 1920s.

In Germany Granowsky worked on some theatre productions, but increasingly moved into film. He collaborated with a number of other Russian exiles such as Léo Lania who shared his left-wing political views. He directed two German films, before emigrating to Paris where he lived for the rest of his life. He produced and directed expensive prestige films The Adventures of King Pausole (1933) and Taras Bulba (1936). He had married a wealthy German woman, but they separated before his death. Despite his lavish lifestyle, Granowsky died comparatively poor.

Selected filmography

Director
 Jewish Happiness (Еврейское счастье; 1925)
 The Song of Life (1931)
 The Trunks of Mr. O.F. (1931)
 The Adventures of King Pausole (1933)
 Moscow Nights (1934)
 Taras Bulba (1936)

References

Bibliography
 Barton, Ruth. Hedy Lamarr: The Most Beautiful Woman in Film. University Press of Kentucky, 2010.

External links

1890 births
1937 deaths
Writers from Moscow
People from Moskovsky Uyezd
Russian Jews
Russian film directors
Russian film producers
Russian theatre directors
Russian military personnel of World War I
Russian exiles
People who emigrated to escape Bolshevism
Emigrants from the Russian Empire to France
Emigrants from the Russian Empire to Germany